Port Hutt is a small settlement and beach on Chatham Island, in New Zealand's Chatham Islands chain. It is located in the northwest of the island, near the northern end of the large indentation of Petre Bay, some 24km from the island's largest settlement Waitangi (which lies near the southern end of Petre Bay).

History

The beach is  where Ngāti Tama and Ngāti Mutunga invaders landed in November 1835. The first victim of the ensuing Moriori genocide, a 12-year-old girl, was flayed alive here and displayed on a post, followed by hundreds more of her people.

The port was one of the Chathams' main harbours during the early years of European settlement. Several vessels were wrecked on the reef, among them the whaling brig Ann and Mary in 1839 and the brigantine Lowestoff in 1847.

Geography
The settlement sits at the edge of a small, deep inlet known as either Port Hutt or Whangaroa Harbour. The inlet is guarded by reefs with surround Point Dawson, the 70-metre high headland at the western edge of the harbour mouth.

References

Chatham Island
Populated places in the Chatham Islands